The Dean is a 52-room boutique hotel located at 122 Fountain Street in Providence, Rhode Island. The building's use as a hotel was part of a renewal project centered in downtown Providence.

History 
Built in 1912, 122 Fountain Street was used as a shelter run by the Episcopal church and also operated as several adult entertainment establishments known for their illegal actions. Prior to it becoming "The Dean", it was a strip club called the Sportsman's Inn. Elements of the hotel's design and décor reference the building's origins.

Design 
The hotel was designed by ASH NYC, and the architects were Kite Architects Inc. The Dean opened in 2014.

The Dean's rooms include oil paintings, tables by Rhode Island sculptor Will Reeves, and fixtures by The Steel Yard. The building also loans out refurbished bicycles.

The Dean currently contains four businesses. Two are food establishments: North, run by James Beard Foundation Award-nominated chef James Mark, and Bolt Coffee. The other two are bars: The Dean Bar and The Boombox.

Reception 
The hotel was listed as one of Condé Nast Traveler's top bargain hotels of 2014, and one of Condé Nast Traveler's top hotels in New England in 2019. It has received positive reviews from Vogue, Goop, Architectural Digest, The New York Times, and GQ.

References

External links 

 Official website

Hotels in Rhode Island
Hotel buildings completed in 1912